A Different Thread is a British-American band based in Lichfield, Staffordshire, England and Durham, North Carolina, US.

Members 
Robert Jackson (born April 6, 1989) Nuneaton UK - Guitar, Harmonica, Singer-Songwriter.  (School of Art and Design University of the West of England, Bristol Bristol)
Alicia Best (born September 1, 1988) Manhattan US, Fiddle, Singer-Songwriter. (Bennington College Performing Arts)

They have performed with different musicians on tours in Guatemala, US, UK, and Europe, including: 
Isaac Collier (born October 15, 1988), North Yorkshire Moors, England - classically trained cellist (Royal Birmingham Conservatoire)
Alan Best (born February 8, 1992) Durham North Carolina US, - Accordion and Mandolin
Gerson Rivera, from Mexico - Cello

Genre
They call themselves "British-Americana", heavily influenced by the Folk Revival of the 1970s, and Appalachian old time music, pulling their sound from the likes of Bob Dylan, Gillian Welch, Rhiannon Giddens, Jonathan Byrd, The Deslondes, John Martyn, and many more. Genres include: Americana, Singer-Songwriter, Folk, Old-Time music, Bluegrass, Country, Blues, Celtic, and folk music of England.

Discography
A Different Thread has released two EPs and one album.
Home From Home (EP) - April 8, 2017
High Time (EP)  - October 1, 2017
On A Whim (LP)  - September 13, 2018

Competitions
2017 Shrewsbury Folk Festival Winners of the Open Mic Competition.

References

External links
 

Americana music groups
American folk musical groups
British folk music groups